Köln-Düsseldorfer (KD) is a river cruise operator based in Cologne, Germany. The company operates a total of 14 cruise ships on the Rhine, Main and Moselle rivers. The famous KD steamer line operated on the Rhine with steamers and tourist boats. The Lorelei rock was a famed day outing for pleasure seekers.

History 

The first steamboats arrived on the Rhine from England in 1816. The Dutch were first to react. In 1824 they founded the Nederlandsche Stoomboot Maatschappij (NSM). After establishing a few local lines from Rotterdam, NSM established a line from Rotterdam to Cologne in 1825.

The founders of NSM negotiated with merchants from Cologne, who participated in NSM. In 1827 the Preussisch-Rheinischen Dampfschiffahrtsgesellschaft (PRDG), then started to operate a steamboat service between Cologne and Mainz. This line cooperated with NSM. Further up the Rhine Dampfschiffahrtsgesellschaft von Rhein und Main (DGRM) operated between Mainz and Strasbourg.

In 1838 the Dampfschiffahrts-Gesellschaft für den Nieder- und Mittelrhein (DGNM), the "Düsseldorf" company was founded. It led to a time of intense competition. At about the same time, the growth of freight and passenger traffic was limited by the expansion of the railways which were constructed along the banks of the Rhine.

The river became heavily travelled during the industrial revolution, by 1856 the millionth ticket was proudly sold. In 1832, the first steamboat journeyed from the North Sea all the way to Basel, but this was not a regular service. Mannheim was an established port by 1840, and  In 1846 the Ludwig-Donau-Canal was completed after 9 years of work. It was named after King Ludwig I of Bavaria. The steamboats also started a new age of tourism in Germany.

In January 1925 PRDG and DGNM founded the Köln-Düsseldorfer Rheinschiffahrts GmbH. This new company became the manager of the two companies. It was also a legal entity which became the owner of some of the assets. Henceforward logistics where managed from Cologne, while the Düsseldorf office was responsible for commerce. In April 1928 the Dutch Nederlandsche Stoomboot Reederij (NSR), which had succeeded to NSM's shipping activities on the Rhine, was entered into the partnership. The NSR had 10 ships, and took 4 from the partners. It also became responsible for the entire freight activities of the Köln-Düsseldorfer. This made 1928 a record year with 2,649 million passengers.

The KD Line acquired 
In 2000, KD Line was purchased by Viking Cruises, making it a subsidiary of the largest river cruise line in the world.

Fleet 
Goethe remains the only vessel now serving with the KD and is the last example of paddle propulsion. She is no longer steam, having been converted to diesel-hydraulic propulsion in 2008-2009.

PS Goethe 
 Built at Cologne in 1913 by Sachsenberg at Cologne-Deutz
 Length : 83 metres - 272 feet (extended from 77.8 m after 1951-2 rebuild)
 Former Engines : Compound Diagonal, built by Sachsenberg at Rosslau

References

External links 

  

Shipping companies of Germany
Companies based in Cologne
Tourist attractions in Cologne
Tourist attractions in Düsseldorf
Rhine
River cruise companies